The New Zealand Cadet Corps (also known as Army Cadets and NZCC), is one of the three corps in the New Zealand Cadet Forces, the other two being the Air Training Corps, and Sea Cadet Corps. There is no reference to the Army within the official title of the NZCC, but an army theme is used for the NZCC. All of its members, from the cadets themselves to the officers and the support committees are civilian volunteers. Members have no obligation to head into the New Zealand Defence Force (NZDF); however, some do choose to join the NZDF.

The modern New Zealand Cadet Forces has seen the former School Cadets transform into the "New Zealand Cadet Corps" and integrated with the New Zealand Air Training Corps and New Zealand Sea Cadet Corps. The New Zealand Cadet Corps has strengthened its ties with the New Zealand Army, with units of the New Zealand Army directly sponsoring and supporting individual Cadet Corps units.

Organisation

National
The NZCC is managed at a national level by the commandant (usually a regular force lieutenant-colonel/wing commander/commander), and their staff based out of Trentham Army Camp. It is supported by the Cadet Corps Association of New Zealand.

Area
The country is divided into 3 areas, Northern (Northern half of the North Island), Central (Southern half of the North Island) and Southern (entire South Island). Each area has a NZCF Training and Support Unit (CFTSU), commanded by NZDF Senior Non-commissioned Officer or Commissioned Officer. Area Coordinator, with advisors for Cadet Corps units.

Unit

Each unit is led and managed by the Cadet Unit Commander, and their officers and staff.

A typical unit has between one and four officers filling various roles. The Cadet Unit Commander appoints all personnel in the unit to their positions. Each unit has an Adjutant, Training Officer, and Stores Officer. These positions are usually filled by a commissioned officer (officers can hold multiple positions if necessary). One or more of the positions may have assistants, the assistants are often junior officers or Senior NCOs.

Each unit also has a cadet NCO holding the position of Company Sergeant Major (holding the rank of Warrant Officer Class Two). If the unit is large enough, each flight of cadets may have a Staff Sergeant. The Company Sergeant Major (CSM) is normally responsible for supervising the NCOs in their various tasks, as a result, the Company Sergeant Major can skip the normal chain of command, enabling them to liaise directly with the Unit Commander. Some Cadet Corps units also permit and hold a drill cane for the Company Sergeant Major to use.

Some Cadet Corps units also utilize the position of 'Drill Sergeant'. Typically holding either the rank of either Sergeant or Staff Sergeant. The role of a Drill Sergeant is to ensure discipline of personnel while undertaking drill. This frees up the Sergeant Major to oversee other unit matters.

Uniform and Insignia

Insignia and Badges 
The uniform worn by NZCC members is the same as that of the New Zealand Army, except that for all ranks, the lettering on the bottom of the rank insignia shoulder boards reads "CADET FORCES" rather than "NEW ZEALAND" to differentiate NZCC personnel from New Zealand Army personnel. Furthermore, NZCC rank insignia are red, a colour no longer used by the New Zealand Army for rank insignia. Officer service dress uniforms have a shoulder flash reading "NEW ZEALAND CADET FORCES", rather than "NEW ZEALAND" for the same reason. The cadets wear the New Zealand Cadet Corps badge on their beret and if their unit has a colour patch this is worn behind the badge.

Cadets wear a shoulder brassard on their right arm to display their individual achievements and to further distinguish them from NZ Army personnel. Cadet achievements include Duke of Edinburgh's Award, Cadet Corps Skills badge, marksman badge and training level badges, as well as the name of the unit they parade with.

Commissioned Officers, Officer Cadets', National and Area Warrant Officers do not wear brassards to distinguish themselves from unit level Warrant Officers.

Uniforms 
The New Zealand Cadet Corps follows the New Zealand Army with regards to uniform standards and clothing items, with all mandatory clothing being issued by the NZ Army. In the past the system used was that a unit would be graded 1-5 based on the quantity of personnel that attended a units parade night. Based on that grading the unit would then be issued an annual allowance for the unit to order new uniform as replacements or to provide to new cadets. The New Zealand Cadet Corps currently operate the following uniforms;

Cadet Working Dress 
The New Zealand Air Training Corps, who also use NZDPM as their working dress, is in the process of rolling out the Air Cadet Working Dress. This role out is scheduled to be completed by the end of 2021 and will free up stocks of DPM for New Zealand Cadet Corps units. The role out of Navy Cadet Working dress in 2022 will foresee the eventual role out of the Army Cadet Working dress in 2023. The new uniform will match the New Zealand Army's Multi Terrain Pattern Uniform. Army Cadets will be issued the same uniform as the Army, however the delay is to enable the complete role out to Defence personnel first.

Ranks 
All actively serving personnel within the New Zealand Cadet Corps have the opportunity to advance through the ranks while in the organisation.

Non-Commissioned Officer Ranks 
Cadet Non-Commissioned Officer ranks are based on the ranks of the New Zealand Army, and are;

The CDT prefix/suffix is used to distinguish regular force personnel from those of the cadet forces.

However, whilst not all cadets become NCOs, all get the chance to train and progress through the different levels of training, Basic, Regimental, Corps, and Advanced levels, by demonstrating knowledge and skills in subjects including cadet forces knowledge, general service knowledge, leadership, firearms safety.

The New Zealand Cadet Corps are the only branch of the New Zealand Cadet Forces that operate the Cadet 6 rank, Cadet Warrant Officer Class Two. Since personnel holding this rank hold the position of Sergeant Major, functionally they are treated the same as a Warrant Officer of the Sea Cadet Corps or Air Training Corps.

Historically personnel holding the rank of Warrant Officer Class Two and the position of Sergeant Major wore blank Cadet 1 rank slides and a wristband while wielding a pace stick signifying their rank and position. From 2014 onwards Cadet Warrant Officer Class Two rank slides were introduced and propagated to entirely replace the wristband, however in keeping with traditions some units still maintain the passage of this wristband from the preceding Sergeant Major to the incoming individual.

Commissioned Officer Ranks 
The Cadet Corps Commissioned Officer Ranks are based on the New Zealand Army, and are;

Note: All instances of Lieutenant are pronounced "Leftenant" in line with the United Kingdom Ministry of Defence pronunciation.

While New Zealand Cadet Forces Officers hold commissions on behalf the New Zealand Parliament, via the Minister of Defence. They are not entitled to be saluted by New Zealand Defence Force personnel. Due to the rank emblems being identical other than the "New Zealand" and "Cadet Forces" identifier, occasionally Cadet Force Officers are saluted by NZDF personnel, if this happens Cadet Force Officers are encouraged to return the salute to be polite.

New Zealand Cadet Force Officers do not hold precedence of rank over NZDF personnel e.g. a Cadet Force Major has no authority to issue orders to a NZDF Second Lieutenant or Non-Commissioned Officers.

Membership

Cadet members
Interested personnel can join between the ages of 13 to 15 (or if attending the first year of high school) and can stay on without being promoted to the age of 18. Senior Non-Commissioned Officers may serve until their 20th birthday. The exception is the sole school-based unit, as opposed to city or regional based units. Hamilton's Fraser High School Cadet Unit permits all students enrolled at the school to enroll in the unit.

Other than black lace up shoes, all uniform is provided upon enrolment into a unit and completion of a training camp where wearing of the uniform is taught. Bonds are sometimes held to ensure that they are returned.

Fees 
Unit fees are set by each unit Parent Support Committee annually. Due to fluctuating operating costs, these vary from unit to unit dependent on the type of activities the unit has planned, although typically fees will be no more than $200 annually.

Adult members

Adult Cadets 
In 2017 the New Zealand Cadet Forces updated their Child Protection policy surrounding cadets who are either Non-Commissioned Officers or personnel who are'

completing cadet level training that are aged 18 and over.

There is a deliberate delineation between an 'Adult' and an 'Officer' as the latter has specific authority to exercise command and control over cadets and other NZCF Officers.

The key difference between a cadet who is an adult and a cadet who is under 18 is that adult cadets and indeed all adults within the New Zealand Cadet Forces are charged with the responsibility of maintaining the safety and welfare of cadets during all NZCF activities. While this doesn't mean that cadets who are classified as adults hold authority over other cadets due to their age, it means that adult cadets are expected to at the very least vocalize to an Officer or Supplementary Staff member when they believe safety and welfare have been compromised.

Cadet Non-Commissioned Officers who are 18 or older are issued a thin white band which is sewn into the rank slide of the individual immediately above the "CADET FORCES" lettering and below the rank emblem.

Officers and Supplementary Staff 
Adult members can serve in two capacities: commissioned officers or Supplementary Staff. Officers are commissioned into the New Zealand Cadet Forces, with the post-nominal letters NZCF, at the rank of second lieutenant, and can be promoted to lieutenant, captain or major after completing the necessary training and service.

In 2014 the organisation introduced a new position of National Support Officer (NSO). This position was designed to place a New Zealand Cadet Force Officer at high level of influence within HQNZCF, which traditionally had his position had been solely occupied by New Zealand Defence Force Personnel. In 2016 with the adoption of the continental staff system the position was renamed to Assistant Commandant. If he or she is an NZCC officer, as opposed to an ATC or SCC officer, they will hold the rank of Lieutenant Colonel.

Officers are unpaid volunteers, therefore they receive no pay for routine parades and unit activities. They are paid when attending training courses run by the New Zealand Defence Force.

Supplementary Staff or SS for short, are civilians who help train cadets. They do not wear uniform, but they are generally treated similarly to officers by cadets. Members of the NZDF are occasionally attached to cadet units to assist in conducting training. This is normally because they know a cadet/officer in that unit, or if they have a particular interest in cadet forces. They are addressed as "Instructor" or by cadets choice, "Sir" or "Ma'am".

Fees 
Most NZCF Officers do not pay any membership fees, this is typically to balance the time and effort put in by NZCF Officers. While Officers are not encouraged to, a large amount contribute anyway, by way of purchasing stationary and equipment for their unit.

Activities

The Duke of Edinburgh's Hillary Award

Officers and Adults 
Any Commissioned Officer in the NZCF or Supplementary Staff member that has an active security clearance is eligible to become an award facilitator, allowing cadets within their unit to actively participate in the award and allows any progress towards the award to be signed off. There is no limit to the number of staff members that can be award facilitators, allowing larger units to focus a staff member to each section of the award.

While the award is directed towards young adults and within the NZCF specifically, the cadets and NCOs, Junior Officers and adults under the age of 25 are also eligible to complete any of the awards (although the Gold award would be the most reasonable).

Cadet Participation 
Run in partnership with the Duke of Edinburgh's Hillary Awards the award is a multi year, voluntary, non-competitive programme of practical, cultural and adventurous activities, designed to support the personal and social development of young people aged 14–25, regardless of gender, background or ability. It offers an individual challenge and encourages young people to undertake exciting, constructive, challenging and enjoyable activities in their free time.

Personnel undertaking the award can begin the activity either through their school, a third party provider, or the New Zealand Cadet Forces with more than 9,000 young adults undertaking the programme each year.

Within the frame of the New Zealand Cadet Forces, parade nights and community service events like Anzac Day parades can count towards the service requirement while weekend camps and courses can count towards the skill section of the awards. The Cadet Fieldcraft Activity can also count towards the Adventurous Journey for all three awards. Cadets are also able to retroactively claim work up to 3 months of work they've done before signing up for their first award. For example, if a cadet completed a NZCF promotional course such as the Senior Non-Commissioned Officer Course shortly before signing up for an award, then they would be able to retroactively use the course for their residential project.

Cadets that successfully complete an award are entitled to wear the pin of the highest award they receive on their brassard (if Air Training Corps or New Zealand Cadet Corps) or Jacket (if Sea Cadet Corps).

Parade nights 
Every unit holds parade nights around 2–4 hours long, each week during school terms. Each parade night usually begins and ends with a parade. The starting parade is used to inspect uniforms, and to inform the cadets on the parade night's activities. The final parade to inform the cadets on upcoming events in the unit. Between the parades, the cadets undergo classroom, or practical instruction.

Bush Craft

All Cadet Corps units conduct classroom training in bush craft and survival skills and hold regular Basic and Advanced bush craft camps in the local area during weekends. The Cadet Fieldcraft activity, renamed and reshaped from the all encompassing 'Fieldcraft course', is a nine-day course that provides Cadets with an enhanced practical experience in field craft to further their outdoor skills training. The course is divided in to two components, the cadet section which offers between 30 and 60 cadets the opportunity to travel around the country to meet and interact with cadets from other squadrons.

Separately the course serves to train Commissioned Officers to be able to lead and manage cadets on day tramps and/or overnight camps on clearly formed tracks in and below the bush line. Officers are taught leadership, risk and crisis management, bush craft skills, and first aid.

The course is held either at RNZAF Dip Flat in the South Island, Waiouru Army base in the North Island, or occasionally Tekapo Army Camp south west of Christchurch.

Firearms Training
Units conduct regular range training with smallbore rifles. Some units have their own armories' and ranges at their parade hall. Cadets must pass a DFTT (Dry Firing Training Test) before being allowed on the range. Cadets who achieve high marks regularly on the range may be awarded a marksmanship badge to be worn on their brassard. There are numerous competitions run by both the New Zealand Cadet Corps and the greater organisation that promotes competitions between units and individuals.

Radio, Cyber, Drones 
Cadets receive training in the use and maintenance of long range radio equipment, allowing them to maintain communications with other groups over extreme distances. On camps and exercises these skills are tested in a practical environment with cadets being placed in the New Zealand bush at long distances from each other and are expected to be able to co-ordinate together.

Public Service 
Each year the New Zealand Cadet Forces participate in numerous public service events around the country. Anzac day represents the most public and personnel intensive deployment for cadet force personnel, often involving the bulk of the units forces. Cadets will form cenotaph and catafalque parties on behalf of, and in partnership with the New Zealand Defence Force.

Another high-profile public service that the NZCF participate in is the annual Poppy Day drive by the RNRSA, where cadets and RSA members work together to raise funds towards helping New Zealand Veterans and the RNRSA.

International Exchanges 
Each year dozens for personnel from the New Zealand Cadet Corps engage in exchanges with international Cadet Organisations and through delegations to countries through the New Zealand Defence Force. The participants can be any rank and a Commissioned NZCF Officer accompanies each group of cadets overseas, providing opportunities for both adult and youth members.

Local Training 
Each Unit holds at least one night per week in order to undertake the Cadet Development Framework. Each unit employs a training officer whose role it is to create and implement a local training programme. The Cadet Development Framework is a four-year program which provides cadets with the opportunity to develop skills in leadership, aviation knowledge, drill, firearms training, fieldcraft, and more.

The programme provides standardisation for training and expected development within Cadet Units for CDT(E) – CDTWOII(E). Some content is applicable to all three Corps of the NZCF, whilst some is specific to particular Corps.

The content of the Four-Year Training Programme is not designed to fill every period during parade nights in a calendar year, but intentionally leaves scope for Cadet Unit Commanders to add content that will add value to their communities, strengthen Unit identity and provide opportunities for cadets that they may not receive outside of NZCF. However, only completion of the prescribed training will ensure that cadets can continue moving through the development model. Delivery of the content of the Four-Year Training Programme is at Cadet Unit Commander's discretion. In time, further resources to assist in delivery will be developed, including parade night lesson plans, instructor guides and additional resources. Currently available resources should be used in the first instance for delivery of training. Where gaps in knowledge or skills exist, Area Advisors and/or Area Support Officers should be engaged.

The training is split in to three different levels off learning that correspond with a cadets progression.

 Lead Self - Years 1-2
 Lead Teams - Year 3+
 Lead Leaders - Year 4+

Courses

Tri-Corps courses  
 Junior NCO course
 Senior NCO course
 Cadet shooting coaches course

Also, senior cadets and officers may be selected to staff these courses (except for the shooting coaches course)

Officer courses 
 Officers' Commissioning course
 Instructional technique & management course
 Officers' outdoor leaders course
 Range safety officer course
 NZCF Command course

Also, officers may be selected to staff these courses, except for the range safety officer course.

NZCC competitions

Regional Skills Competition
The Regional Skills Competition tests NZCC cadets on a wide range of skills, such as things like GSK & CFK (knowledge of the NZDF and NZCF respectively), rifle shooting, navigation and drill. It is held every year in the Northern, Central and Southern areas. The Northern Area competition is often held at Tamaki Leadership Centre, Central held at RNZAF Base Ohakea and Southern held at Burnham Military Camp. Each competition's winner is then sent on to compete in the National Skills Competition.

National Skills Competition

The National Skills Competition is more in line with New Zealand Army activities than other competitions, and is intended to provide a challenge comparable to an army exercise. It focuses more on fieldcraft and teamwork than the Regional Skills Competition, and also gives more freedom for the team's leader for decision making. It is often held at the Waiouru Military Camp in the central North Island. Teams who place 1st in the national skills competition are entitled to wear the NZCC National Skills Badge on their brassard.

Shooting Competitions

Gunson Cup Shooting Trophy 
Originally awarded to the best first year cadet .22 rifle team in the School Cadet Corps now is presented to the winning team of the New Zealand Cadet Corps smallbore postal shoot.

This competition also represents one of the only opportunity for New Zealand Cadet Corps personnel to earn the NZCF Marksman Badge. In order to be awarded the badge a cadet must, while competing in the Gunson Shooting Competition achieve a score of 80% or more. The other Two Badges are awarded under this competitions ruleset.

There is a common misconception that NZCF personnel can only attain the marksman badge in the Wallingford competition. This is not the case. The NZCF 160 Competitions and Awards Manual states the following.

Fennell Shooting Competition 
The Ffennell competitions are a group of small-bore rifle matches for the youth of the Commonwealth. New Zealand Cadet Forces units contest the Class B competitions (using issued rifles and sights). The matches are held under the authority of the Commonwealth Postal Competitions Committee (CPCC). All international correspondence on behalf of the CPCC will be handled by the Council for Cadet Rifle Shooting.
The aim of these team matches is to encourage the Youth of the Commonwealth to participate in the sport of small-bore target rifle shooting.

Entry is open to any unit or sub-unit of the following:

 New Zealand Cadet Forces;
 Junior Servicemen of the New Zealand Defence Forces in one establishment; and
 Other youth groups approved by the CPCC.

Units may enter one or more teams. Each team shall consist of eight firers. A shooter cannot shoot on more than one team. The team captain may or may not be one of these eight. All members of the team must be under the age of 19 years on the day of firing the match, and be serving members of the same unit or sub-unit.

Each team member will fire two cards, 10 rounds to count being fired at each card, with two rounds fired at each aiming mark. Sighting shots will be completed before the practice begins. The whole team need not complete shooting in one day. Highest Possible Score (HPS) is 200. Team HPS is 1600.

See also
 United Kingdom Army Cadet Force

References

External links
 New Zealand Cadet Forces Web Site

Army cadet organisations
Cadet Corps, New Zealand
Cadet Corps, New Zealand